The South Drain flows in a generally north-westerly direction from Actis Tunnel to Gold Corner, where it moves on to the Huntspill River, in Somerset, England. It flows through the Shapwick Heath Nature Reserve.

It was constructed between 1802 and 1806 as a result of the 1801 Brue Drainage Act.

References 

Rivers of Somerset
Somerset Levels